These quarterbacks have started at least one game for the Oakland/Los Angeles/Las Vegas Raiders of the National Football League. They are listed in order of the date of each player's first start at quarterback for the team.

Starting quarterbacks

The number of games they started during the season is listed to the right:

Regular season

Postseason

Most games started
These quarterbacks have the most starts for the Raiders in regular season games (through the 2022 NFL season).

Team career passing records
(Through the 2022 NFL season)

See also
 List of American Football League players
 Lists of NFL starting quarterbacks

References
 Las Vegas Raiders Team Encyclopedia

Las Vegas Raiders

quarterbacks